Georgi Bizhev (born 6 July 1981 in Blagoevgrad) is a Bulgarian footballer who plays for Spartak Varna as a forward.

References
 
 

1981 births
Living people
Bulgarian footballers
Association football forwards
OFC Pirin Blagoevgrad players
PFC Pirin Blagoevgrad players
PFC Slavia Sofia players
PFC Spartak Pleven players
PFC Marek Dupnitsa players
Vyzas F.C. players
PFC Velbazhd Kyustendil players
PFC Belasitsa Petrich players
PFC Spartak Varna players
FC Sportist Svoge players
FC Gomel players
First Professional Football League (Bulgaria) players
Second Professional Football League (Bulgaria) players
Expatriate footballers in Belarus
Expatriate footballers in Greece
Expatriate footballers in Poland
ŁKS Łomża players
Sportspeople from Blagoevgrad